"Once Upon a Time" is a 1964 single released by Marvin Gaye and Mary Wells from their sole duet album, Together. "Once Upon a Time' was written by Clarence Paul, Barney Ales, Dave Hamilton and William "Mickey" Stevenson. The song's co-writer, Dave Hamilton, also plays the vibraharp solo on the record.

Background
The song discussed how the two narrators felt lonely until they met each other referring to their past as it happened "once upon a time".

Cash Box described it as "a most attractive shuffle-beat cha cha romancer" and an "excellent instrumental showcase."

Personnel
All vocals by Marvin Gaye and Mary Wells
Produced by William "Mickey" Stevenson
Instrumentation by The Funk Brothers

Chart history
"Once Upon a Time" brought simultaneous top forty pop success for the duo as the single hit number nineteen while its b-side, "What's the Matter with You Baby" peaked at number seventeen on the pop singles chart.

References

1964 singles
Marvin Gaye songs
Mary Wells songs
Male–female vocal duets
Songs written by William "Mickey" Stevenson
Songs written by Clarence Paul
1964 songs
Motown singles